NVT may refer to:
 Norton Villiers Triumph, a defunct British motorcycle manufacturer
 Network Virtual Terminal, a telecommunications concept originating in the Telnet protocol
 The IATA airport code for the Ministro Victor Konder International Airport in Brazil
 Another name for the canonical ensemble, where the number of particles (N) and volume (V) of the system are held constant and the temperature (T) is in equilibrium with that of its heat bath.
 Nguyễn Văn Thiệu, a general and later president (1967–75) of the Republic of Vietnam
 n.v.t. (neutron, velocity, time), an older term used instead of n/cm² for neutron fluence.